JHG may refer to:

 Xishuangbanna Gasa Airport (IATA code JHG)
 Janus Henderson Group
 John Henry Grose